Terminate may refer to:

Electrical termination, ending a wire or cable properly to prevent interference
Termination of employment, the end of an employee's duration with an employer
Terminate with extreme prejudice, a euphemism for assassination
terminate-and-stay-resident program, utility programs used in DOS
exit (system call), to terminate the execution of a running software program
Terminate (software) - (terminat.exe), a shareware modem terminal and host program for MS-DOS in the 1990s

See also
Terminator (disambiguation)
Terminus (disambiguation)
Termination (disambiguation)
Terminal (disambiguation)